Yao Naiqiang (born September 1936) is a Chinese translator. He was one of the main translators of the works of the American novelists F. Scott Fitzgerald and Nathaniel Hawthorne into Chinese.

He is currently a professor and a doctoral supervisor of PLA Foreign Language College, a member of the National College Professional Foreign Language Teaching Steering Committee, and a standing director of China English Teaching Association.

Biography
Yao was born in Shanghai, in September 1936. He joined the People's Liberation Army in July 1951 and enrolled in the military academy to study English. In 1957 he graduated from Peking University, where he majored in English language and literature. In 2010 the Chinese Translation Association conferred on him the title of "Senior Translator".

Works
 The Great Gatsby
 The Scarlet Letter
 Xinhua Dictionary with English Translation

References

1936 births
Living people
Writers from Shanghai
Peking University alumni
English–Chinese translators
People's Republic of China translators
Educators from Shanghai